Niganda strigifascia is a moth of the  family Notodontidae. It is found in Asia, from India to Sumatra.

Subspecies
Niganda strigifascia strigifascia Moore, 1879
Niganda strigifascia coelestis (Kiriakoff, 1962)

References
 

Moore, 1879. Descr. Indian lep. Atkinson (1): 63, pl. 3, f. 15

Notodontidae